Prince Wladimir Cesarevich Guedroitz (in Russian: Владимир Цезаревич Гедройц) was Chamberlain of the Imperial Court of Russia, Actual State Councilor and Chairman of the Control Commission of the Russian Empire.

Biography

Prince Wladimir Guedroitz was born in Tver (Russia) in 1873 and died in Courbevoie (France) in 1941.

He married in Saint Petersburg (1895) Olga Nicolaevna Karmaline (Drivan (Lithuania) 1872 + Courbevoie (France) 1941) who was the daughter of General Nicholas Nicholaevich Karmaline and his wife  born Lubov Ivanovna Belenitzine.

From this union were born three sons : Prince Nicholas Wladimirovich Guedroitz (Saint Petersburg (Russia) 1896 + Kórós (Hungary) 1923), Prince Michael Wladimirovich Guedroitz (Saint Petersburg (Russia) 1899 + Biarritz (France) 1966) and Prince Alexis Wladimirovich Guedroitz (Saint Petersburg (Russia) 1904 and 1918).

Prince Wladimir Guedroitz was the grandfather of professor and interpreter Alexis Guedroitz.

References

See also

Russian Biographical Dictionary
Giedroyć

1873 births
People from Tver
Nobility from the Russian Empire
Emigrants from the Russian Empire to France
1941 deaths